Jan Leeming (born Janet Dorothy Atkins; 5 January 1942) is an English TV presenter and newsreader.

Early life and personal life
Leeming was born in Barnehurst, Kent, and educated at the Assumption Convent, Charlton and St Joseph's Convent Grammar School, Abbey Wood.

Leeming has been married and divorced five times. She also had a brief relationship in the 1960s with New Zealand writer Owen Leeming, between her first and second marriages. Although they never married, she took his name by deed poll and did not change it after their separation.

Career

Presenter and actress
She worked as an actress and presenter in Australia and New Zealand before becoming a well-known face on British television in regional and children's programmes. An early UK TV role came in the BBC sitcom Hugh and I in December 1966. In 1969, she joined the presenting team of BBC1's children's science programme Tom Tom, which she co-hosted until 1970. In 1976, she fronted the 10–part BBC2 handicraft series Knitting Fashion which was repeated several times through to 1978. From 1977, she was the presenter of the BBC's regional programme Zodiac & Co for the South West area, switching to the Midlands for the regional show Midlands Tonight in 1979. Leeming began a long stint presenting the Monday–Friday BBC1 afternoon show Pebble Mill at One between 1976 and 1979, during which time she also often co-presented Radio 4's Woman's Hour. Beginning in April 1980, she became one of Britain's best-known newsreaders across the BBC and also hosted the 1982 Eurovision Song Contest.

She has kept a relatively low profile since leaving the newsroom in 1987, with bit parts and one-off specials including as a stand-in newsreader for the Channel 4's breakfast show The Big Breakfast during the 1990s. Her recent appearances include one as herself in the film Whatever Happened to Harold Smith?, starring Tom Courtenay, in 1999; and latterly on The Harry Hill Show; So Graham Norton; Lowri; Good Morning Australia; Esther and Through the Keyhole. At the Barbican she presented the RAF concert to mark the 60th anniversary of the Battle of Britain.

Since 2000, much of her time has been spent in corporate work and her longtime passion working with a cheetah conservation charity in South Africa. She appeared in Safari School, a reality television series, which was first broadcast on BBC Two during January and February 2007.

In February 2010, Leeming appeared in a special celebrity episode of the dining programme Come Dine with Me for Channel 4.

I'm a Celebrity... Get Me Out of Here!
In November 2006, Leeming was a contestant on the sixth series of I'm a Celebrity...Get Me Out of Here! on ITV. Leeming has done a record number of six 'Bush Tucker' trials. For one of the trials, Leeming volunteered and for the other five she was voted to do them by the British public. Some of her trials included being lowered into a dark tunnel with various unpleasant creatures, shut in a box amongst snakes, jumping out of a plane at 14,000 feet to catch falling stars and having to eat various insects and Australian delicacies to win food for camp. During that trial, Leeming ate a vomit fruit and a witchety grub smoothie. However, she refused to eat a kangaroo's eye, tongue, anus and reproductive organs. Leeming was evicted on the 19th day of the series where she came 6th.

Searching for René
In 2013, Leeming researched, wrote and presented a documentary on WW2 Free French Pilot, René Mouchotte. BBC 1 South East Inside Out. Currently considering writing a book about her 6 year extensive Search.  Through her research she met the Director of the Allied Air Forces Museum at Elvington near York. Ian Reed was able to source historic material which added to Leeming's programme. She is now a Vice President of the Museum.

The Real Marigold Hotel
In January and February 2016, Leeming appeared in the three-part BBC series The Real Marigold Hotel, which followed a group of celebrity senior citizens including Miriam Margolyes and Wayne Sleep on a journey to India. In December 2017, she also appeared in the second season of The Real Marigold on Tour to Havana.

Celebrity First Dates
Broadcast on 2 November 2017, Leeming took part in a special celebrity edition of Channel 4's First Dates, in aid of Stand Up To Cancer.

Money for Nothing 
Celebrity edition. Leeming donated the money raised to Brooke, Action for Working Horses and Donkeys.

The Real Marigold on Tour - Cuba
Leeming joined Miriam Margolyes, Wayne Sleep and Bobby George in BBC One programme 'The Real Marigold on Tour' when they visited Cuba to look at how Cubans treat their elderly and the way the elderly spend their retirement. She also went on a date with a local.

The Real Marigold on Tour - Argentina
In February 2019, Leeming joined Sheila Ferguson, Wayne Sleep and Paul Nicholas in BBC One programme 'The Real Marigold on Tour' when they visited Buenos Aires, Argentina.

See also
 List of Eurovision Song Contest presenters

References

External links
 – official site

1942 births
Living people
English television presenters
BBC newsreaders and journalists
People from Bexley
I'm a Celebrity...Get Me Out of Here! (British TV series) participants